Bradbury is a city in the San Gabriel Valley region of Los Angeles County, California, United States. It is located in the foothills of the San Gabriel Mountains below Angeles National Forest. Bradbury is bordered by the city of Monrovia to the west and south, and Duarte to the south and east. The population was 1,048 at the 2010 census, up from 855 at the 2000 census. A significant portion of the properties in Bradbury Estates and Woodlyn Lane are zoned for horses, and several horse ranches still exist within these communities today.

History
Bradbury was founded by Lewis Leonard Bradbury on the homestead of Rancho Azusa de Duarte in 1881.  In 1912 the Bradburys' daughter, Minerva, married Isaac Polk and built a grand mansion on the property which they named Chateau Bradbury. After years of annexation attempts by the city of Monrovia, Bradbury incorporated in 1957. The paperwork for incorporation arrived in a rush to prevent the area from becoming part of the new city of Duarte, which also incorporated on the same day, August 22, 1957. Still, many ties between the two communities remain in that they both form the Duarte Unified School District; they both share the same post office and the 91008 ZIP code; and they both share combined public services such as the Los Angeles County Sheriff's Department and Los Angeles County Fire Department, and garbage pickup (provided by Burrtec Waste Services).

Geography

Demographics

2010
At the 2010 census Bradbury had a population of 1,048. The racial makeup of Bradbury was 652 (62.2%) White (49.0% Non-Hispanic White), 22 (2.1%) African American, 4 (0.4%) Native American, 276 (26.3%) Asian, 0 (0.0%) Pacific Islander, 59 (5.6%) from other races, and 35 (3.3%) from two or more races. Hispanic or Latino of any race were 218 people (20.8%).

The whole population lived in households, no one lived in non-institutionalized group quarters and no one was institutionalized.

There were 354 households, 92 (26.0%) had children under the age of 18 living in them, 231 (65.3%) were opposite-sex married couples living together, 27 (7.6%) had a female householder with no husband present, 15 (4.2%) had a male householder with no wife present.  There were 18 (5.1%) unmarried opposite-sex partnerships, and 2 (0.6%) same-sex married couples or partnerships. 61 households (17.2%) were one person and 24 (6.8%) had someone living alone who was 65 or older. The average household size was 2.96.  There were 273 families (77.1% of households); the average family size was 3.27.

The age distribution was 173 people (16.5%) under the age of 18, 84 people (8.0%) aged 18 to 24, 196 people (18.7%) aged 25 to 44, 386 people (36.8%) aged 45 to 64, and 209 people (19.9%) who were 65 or older.  The median age was 49.1 years. For every 100 females, there were 94.1 males.  For every 100 females age 18 and over, there were 89.0 males.

There were 400 housing units at an average density of 204.2 per square mile, of the occupied units 307 (86.7%) were owner-occupied and 47 (13.3%) were rented. The homeowner vacancy rate was 1.0%; the rental vacancy rate was 7.8%.  934 people (89.1% of the population) lived in owner-occupied housing units and 114 people (10.9%) lived in rental housing units.

2000
At the 2000 census there were 855 people in 284 households, including 239 families, in the city. The population density was 447.3 inhabitants per square mile (172.8/km). The racial makeup of the city was 70.53% White, 1.75% Black or African American, 0.23% Native American, 19.53% Asian, 5.61% from other races, and 2.34% from two or more races.  13.92% of the population were Hispanic or Latino of any race.
Of the 284 households 33.1% had children under the age of 18 living with them, 69.4% were married couples living together, 8.8% had a female householder with no husband present, and 15.5% were non-families. 12.0% of households were one person and 3.9% were one person aged 65 or older.  The average household size was 3.01 and the average family size was 3.21.

The age distribution was 24.7% under the age of 18, 5.7% from 18 to 24, 25.5% from 25 to 44, 28.8% from 45 to 64, and 15.3% 65 or older.  The median age was 42 years. For every 100 females, there were 90.4 males.  For every 100 females age 18 and over, there were 95.2 males.

The median household income was $100,454 and the median family income  was $106,736. Males had a median income of $56,250 versus $40,000 for females. The per capita income for the city was $57,717.  None of the families and 2.0% of the population were living below the poverty line, including no under eighteens and none of those over 64.

Government

Bradbury had voted for the Republican presidential nominee in every election for president since at least 1964 in which there was a verifiable vote total. In 1992, 100 of the 105 votes for third-party candidates were cast for independent candidate Ross Perot In 2016, Bradbury was one of only five cities in Los Angeles County that voted for Donald J. Trump over Hillary Rodham Clinton In 2020, however, the city voted for Joe Biden, marking the first time it voted for a Democrat for president since its incorporation.

Education

Bradbury and Duarte are both served by the Duarte Unified School District.

Infrastructure

Public safety
The Los Angeles County Sheriff's Department (LASD) serves Bradbury through the operation of the Duarte satellite substation as well as the Temple Station in Temple City.

The Los Angeles County Fire Department provides fire protection services, their services assigned to Station 44 in Duarte with backup paramedic assistance from Stations 29 in Baldwin Park and 32 in Azusa, as well as the Monrovia Fire Department.

Notable people
Danny Bakewell, civil rights activist and businessman
Gale Banks, race car driver and founder of Gale Banks Engineering
Adrián Beltré (former), baseball player, former member of the Texas Rangers
Babe Dahlgren (deceased), baseball player
Kent Desormeaux (former), jockey, member of racing hall of fame
Lap Shun Hui, tech entrepreneur; co-founder of eMachines and former owner of Packard Bell
Zhang Jizhong, prominent Chinese film producer
Adam Kolawa (deceased), software developer and co-founder of Parasoft
Richard E. Mandella (former), horse trainer, member of racing hall of fame
Corey Nakatani (former), jockey
Peter Popoff, televangelist
Yang Rong, billionaire Chinese automotive tycoon
Ahmed bin Salman bin Abdulaziz Al Saud (deceased), Saudi Arabian prince
Alex Solis (former), jockey
Mickey Thompson (deceased), race car driver, murdered at his home in Bradbury.
Lynsi Snyder, former resident, owner of and heiress to In-N-Out Burger
R. Stanley Williams (former), nanotechnologist

References

External links

1957 establishments in California
Cities in Los Angeles County, California
Communities in the San Gabriel Valley
Gated communities in California
Incorporated cities and towns in California
Populated places established in 1957